Prem Kaa Game is a 2010 Bollywood romantic comedy film produced and directed by Ashok Kheny and starring Arbaaz Khan, Tara Sharma, Madhuri Bhattacharya, Rakesh Bedi, Johnny Lever and Sameer Kochhar. Salman Khan appears in the film as a narrator. The film was released on 26 March 2010. The film was initially known as Shaadi Ke After Effects, supposedly directed by Indrajit Lankesh. It is a remake of 2004 Kannada film Bisi Bisi starring Ramesh Aravind, Anu Prabhakar, and Madhuri Bhattacharya, which itself was loosely based on the 1955 movie The Seven Year Itch.

Plot

Prem (Arbaaz Khan) is married to Sheetal (Tara Sharma) and has a lovely daughter, Pinky (Shriya Sharma) with her as well. They are happy together...that is until a young model, Twinkle (Madhuri Bhattacharya) moves into town as their next-door neighbor and Prem falls for her charms.

Will Prem forget that he is a married man? Will his daughter's love prove to be lesser than the love of a sizzling new girl? Will 7 years of marriage go down the drain?

Cast
Salman Khan as Jaggu (narrator)
Arbaaz Khan as Prem Sahni
Tara Sharma as Sheetal Sahni
Shriya Sharma as Pinky Sahni, Prem's daughter 
Madhuri Bhattacharya as Twinkle Chopra
Malaika Arora as The Dream Girl
Rakesh Bedi as Roop Chand Rathod
Johnny Lever as Ramnik Chedda
Razzak Khan as Lalwani
Sameer Kochhar as Nikhil
Vivek Shauq as Mishra
Lilliput as Dr. Screwvala
Zabyn Khan as Item Girl

Soundtrack
The music of the film is composed by Raju Singh. It consisted of 7 songs with a total runtime of 33:12. The music was released on Junglee Music. Lyrics were penned by Kiran Kotrial.

Track listing

References

External links

2010s Hindi-language films
2010 films
Hindi remakes of Kannada films